Starchild is an album released by D.I.T.C. member O.C. in early 2005 through Boston based imprint Grit Records. First released in Japan, the album was planned for a US release but was shelved because of problems with sample clearances for several of the LP's songs. The limited copies that were pressed up (20,000) are since long out-of-stock though the album can be bought as downloadable MP3 files on sites such as Amazon (even a used copy on sites such as Discogs.com or Amazon is rarely found).

Unlike O.C.'s previous two LPs, Starchild does not feature any guestspots at all (Pharoahe Monch is featured on the first song "Evaridae" but only sings the hook) and was also his first album to not feature any production or help from his crewmembers in D.I.T.C. (especially producer Buckwild has been a driving force in all three previous O.C. projects to this). Instead O.C. tried to go for a new sound with talented but more-or-less unknown producers, with Vanguard, Floyd the Locsmif (credited as "Locsmif") and Swedish Soul Supreme each offering a string of soulful boom-bap tracks. Starchild also features much scratching and cuts in true hip-hop fashion, these are performed by DJ Revolution and DJ Statik Selektah (who also produces the albums "Intro" and "Outro").

After Starchild, one of the most bootlegged albums of the year was revealed to be shelved and never released in the United States, a modified version started circulating. This version would feature a few of the original songs, while others would be remixed by the likes of Pete Rock (who's 2 of his remixes were up on his MySpace a while back) and Diamond D. The album has yet to materialize.

Track listing

Samples
"1nce Again"
"Let Me Know the Truth" by Four Tops
"Getaway"
"Fare Thee Well" by Bell & James
"Special"
"You're Special" by Commodores
"Story to Tell"
"Try Love Again" by The Natural Four
"The Professional"
"Books and Basketball (Monologue)" by Billy Preston and Syreeta
"What Am I Supposed to Do?"
"Walkin' in the Rain With the One I Love" by Love Unlimited
"Ya Don't Stop"
"You're Just What I Need" by Betty Wright
"Memory Lane"
"Remember the Pain" by 21st Century

2005 albums
O.C. (rapper) albums
Albums produced by Statik Selektah